Giannis Chasavetis (Smyrna, 1899Athens, 1943) is a Greek bouzouki virtuoso. At the age of 23, Chasavetis left his homeland as a refugee of the 1922 destruction of Smyrna. Settling in Athens, he met and worked with other prominent rebetiko artists of his time. Main theme of the songs that he played is the hardships that Greek refugees faced at that period.

Singers from Athens
Greek rebetiko singers
20th-century Greek male singers
Musicians from İzmir
Smyrniote Greeks
Greeks from the Ottoman Empire
1899 births
1943 deaths
Greek refugees
Emigrants from the Ottoman Empire to Greece